Children's Healthcare Is a Legal Duty (CHILD) is an American nonprofit membership organization that works to stop child abuse and neglect based on religious beliefs, cultural traditions, and quackery. CHILD opposes religious exemptions from child health and safety laws. These exemptions have been used as a defense in criminal cases when parents have withheld lifesaving medical care on religious grounds. These exemptions also have discouraged reporting and investigation of religion-based medical neglect of children and spawned many outbreaks of vaccine-preventable diseases and deaths. CHILD publicizes the ideological abuse and neglect of children, lobbies for equal protection laws for children, and files lawsuits and amicus curiae briefs in related cases.

CHILD was founded in 1983 by Rita and Douglas Swan after the death of their son, Matthew. When Matthew developed a high fever in 1977, several Christian Science practitioners, who claimed they were healing Matthew, persuaded the Swans not to seek medical treatment for him. After he had been ill for 12 days, the Swans did take Matthew to the hospital, but his illness had progressed too far and he died of meningitis.

According to the National Association of Counsel for Children, which gave an award to Rita Swan for her efforts, "Due in large part to CHILD's efforts, Colorado, Massachusetts, Maryland, South Dakota, Hawaii, and Oregon have removed laws which provided exemptions from prosecution to parents who fail to provide medical care for their sick children based on religion".

History
Rita and Douglas Swan founded CHILD as a legacy to their son, Matthew. In 1977 he became ill with bacterial meningitis. The Swans, Christian Scientists at the time, were persuaded by Christian Scientist practitioners – the religion's name for its spiritual healers – not to seek medical treatment for their son. When one of the practitioners said Matthew might have a broken bone, which Christian Scientists are allowed to go to a doctor for, the Swans took their baby to a hospital after he had been ill for 12 days, but his illness had progressed too far, and he died. Motivated by this tragedy, CHILD works to eliminate religious exemptions in child health and safety laws. Parents belonging to various religions, in particular Christian Science, have used these exemptions as legal defenses in criminal cases for failing to provide medical care for children who then died.

Following the death of their son, the Swans left the Christian Science Church, and in 1983, Rita Swan founded the nonprofit organization, Children's Healthcare is a Legal Duty (CHILD), and has worked "relentlessly" to publicize cases of religion-related child abuse and neglect.  In 1998, Rita Swan and Seth Asser published a benchmark study in Pediatrics that analyzed 140 child deaths in which medical treatment was withheld. This study showed that 90% of these children would have survived with routine medical care.

In 1996 Congress added to the Child Abuse Prevention and Treatment Act a provision that nothing in the act can "be construed as establishing a Federal requirement that a parent or legal guardian provide any medical service or treatment that is against the religious beliefs of the parent or legal guardian". CHILD has opposed this provision on several fronts. CHILD's work has led to the repeal of some or all religious exemptions to child neglect laws in Colorado, Massachusetts, Maryland, South Dakota, Hawaii, Oregon, Minnesota, Ohio, and Rhode Island. In 2009, CHILD lobbied successfully to remove provisions from the federal Affordable Care Act that would have provided government funding and mandated insurance coverage for faith healing that did not also include medical care.

Mission and activities
CHILD'S mission is to end child abuse and religious-based medical neglect, cultural practices, or pseudoscience through public education, research, and a limited amount of lobbying to support laws that protect children against maltreatment. The organization also files lawsuits and amicus curiae briefs in related court cases.

CHILD supports:
Laws requiring medical care of children, including preventive and diagnostic measures, without exception for religious belief
Reporting of child abuse and child neglect without religious exemption
Licensing of child care facility, including those run by churches
Ratification of the UN Convention on the Rights of the Child

Legal actions
The Swans filed a wrongful death suit against the Christian Science Church in 1980, but it was dismissed on First Amendment grounds, and the U.S. Supreme Court declined to hear their case on appeal.  In 2000, CHILD sued the director of the Centers for Medicare and Medicaid Services and the Secretary of the U.S. Department of Health and Human Services (Children's Healthcare Is a Legal Duty, Inc. v. Min De Parle), over federal healthcare monies being directed to Christian Science facilities and others that provide no medical treatment. The suit, alleging a violation of the establishment clause, was dismissed with summary judgment; on appeal, the judgment was upheld, and the Supreme Court declined to hear an appeal.

Other legal cases include CHILD Inc. and Brown v. Deters challenging Ohio's religious defense to child endangerment and manslaughter (ORC 2919.22a) and CHILD Inc. v. Vladeck against the federal government's use of medicare and medicaid funds for Christian Science nursing.

Testimony before legislatures

Oregon Senate Judiciary Committee, 26 April 2011
Oregon House Judiciary Committee, 21 February 2011
Wisconsin Assembly Committee on Children and Families, 17 March 2010
Nebraska State Legislature, Health and Human Services Committee, 25 January 2007
Iowa House Education Subcommittee, January 2006
Maine Joint Standing Committee on Health and Human Services, May 2005
Nebraska State Legislature, Education Committee, February 2005
Rhode Island House Health, Education, and Welfare Committee, February 2004
Missouri House Judiciary Committee, April 2003
Colorado Senate Health, Environment, Children, and Families Committee, April 2001
Maryland House Judiciary Committee, March 2001
Colorado House Criminal Justice Committee, February 2001
Oregon House Criminal Law Committee, March 1999
South Dakota House and Senate Health and Human Services Committees, February 1998
Michigan House Judiciary Committee, February 1997
U. S. Senate Labor and Human Resources staff briefing, June 1995
Minnesota House Judiciary Committee, March 1994
Minnesota House Judiciary Committee, December 1991
Minnesota Senate Judiciary Committee, March 1991
South Dakota House State Affairs Committee, January 1990
California Assembly Committee on Public Safety, October 1989
Ohio House Children and Youth Committee, March 1989
Ohio House Children and Youth Subcommittee, March 1985
North Dakota House of Representatives, January 1979

Publications

Recognition
American Academy of Pediatrics (AAP): 2012 President's Certificate for Outstanding Service awarded to Rita Swan, MA, PhD for efforts in children's rights to medical care and decades of work with the AAP on these issues.
Iowa Chapter of the Methodist Federation for Social Action: 6 June 2010 Outstanding Social Justice Work Award.
Omicron Delta Kappa chapter at Morningside College: 27 April 2003 Honoris Causa Award.
National Association of Counsel for Children (NACC): 2001 Outstanding Legal Advocacy Award received by Rita Swan, MA, PhD for working to protect children from religious-based medical neglect through policy advocacy and amicus curiae work.
Oregon Pediatric Society: 17 June 2000 Child Advocacy Service Award.
Oregon Peace Officers Association Child Abuse and Sex Crimes Investigators: 2 November 1999 Award for Child Advocacy.
The Giraffe Heroes Project: 12 January 1993 Award for Risk-Taking and Service.
Sioux City Human Rights Commission: 2 May 1991 Human Rights Service Award.
South Dakota Chapter of the AAP: 14 September 1990 Child Advocacy Service Award.

References

Further reading

External links

National Association of Counsel for Children
San Diego Conference on Responding to Child Maltreatment

Christian Science
Lobbying organizations in the United States
Organizations established in 1983
Non-profit organizations based in Lexington, Kentucky
1983 establishments in Kentucky